Thomas Span Plunket, 2nd Baron Plunket (1792–1866), was Bishop of Tuam, Killaly and Achonry.

Plunket was the first son of William Plunket, 1st Baron Plunket and his wife, Catherine (née McCausland). He was educated at St John's College, Cambridge. He served as Dean of Down from 1831 to 1839 before being elevated to the episcopacy as Bishop of Tuam, Killala and Achonry in 1839, a position he held until his death in 1866. He moved to live on a private estate at Tourmakeady, where he evicted many Catholic families for not sending their children to the Protestant school. In 1852 he built a Protestant church in the vicinity.

On the death of his father in 1854, he became the 2nd Baron Plunket. On his death, he was succeeded as Baron Plunket by his younger brother. His middle name is taken from his maternal grandmother, Elizabeth (née Span). He was buried in the churchyard of his now-ruined church at Tourmakeady.

Family
On 26 October 1819, Plunket married Louisa-Jane (1798–1893), 2nd daughter of John William Foster of Fanevalley, County Louth.

Their children were:
 Katherine Plunket (1820–1932) - the longest-lived Irish person ever
 Emily (d. Rome, 1843)
 Mary
 Frederica Plunket (1838–1886)
 Gertrude (1 February 1841 – 1924)

References

1792 births
1866 deaths
Alumni of St John's College, Cambridge
Deans of Down
Ordained peers
Bishops of Tuam, Killala, and Achonry
19th-century Anglican archbishops
Barons in the Peerage of the United Kingdom
Eldest sons of British hereditary barons
Members of the Privy Council of Ireland